A gas gun may refer to:
 A projectile-firing gun powered by compressed air:
 Air gun
 Airsoft gun (in particular a gas blowback airsoft gun)
 Devices described as pneumatic cannons:
 Dynamite gun
 Holman Projector
 M61 Vulcan (also hydraulically operated)
 Potato cannon
 Certain non-lethal or less-lethal firearms:
 Gas pistol
 Riot gun, especially when loaded with CS gas grenades
 Vortex ring gun
 A gun that fires a stream of gas. This can be for these purposes among others:
 To generate a loud noise as a bird scarer
 For astronaut propulsion in outer space
 Light-gas gun, a velocity-generating device used in physics experiments
 A gas-operated firearm mechanism